The Lincoln Mark LT is a luxury pickup truck that was sold by Lincoln. It first went on sale in January 2005 for the 2006 model year. The Mark LT is essentially a rebadged luxury-trimmed version of the popular Ford F-150 truck. The Mark LT is a successor to the failed 2002-only Lincoln Blackwood. The Mark LT was built at Ford's River Rouge Plant in Dearborn, Michigan, and at the Ford Cuautitlan plant in Cuautitlán, Mexico, on the same lines as the closely related Ford F-150.

The Mark LT is based on the Ford F-150 pickup truck. It uses the same 330-cubic-inch,  5.4 L Triton V8 and has four doors. The Mark LT also had optional all-wheel drive.

Lincoln had hoped to sell 13,000 Mark LT's annually in the United States. The Mark LT was more successful than the Blackwood in its first year of sales with 10,274 sold in the first calendar year of sales (February 2005 through February 2006). The 2006 Mark LT outsold the Cadillac Escalade EXT, but the 2007 EXT gained on the Mark LT's sales consistently. After disappointing sales, the Mark LT was cancelled in the United States and Canada after the first generation, but a second generation was sold in Mexico where it was often the Lincoln Division's best selling model.



First generation (2006–2008)

For 2007, the Mark LT received a grille facelift, optional DVD-based navigation system and other luxury and cosmetic features. For 2008, the Mark LT received the addition of the color of Light French Silk clearcoat metallic and an optional rearview camera back-up system.

Retirement
Ford ceased sales of the Lincoln Mark LT in the United States and Canada after the 2008 model year. In its place, Ford created an upper-end trim of the 2009 F-150 called Platinum.

Second generation (2010–2014)

Although the Mark LT met with poor sales and cancellation in the United States, Lincoln dealers in Mexico found the pickup to become the best-selling model for the division. As a result, Lincoln received an all-new Mark LT for the 2010 model year but only for the Mexican market. Based upon the twelfth generation F-150 introduced a year before, the Mark LT shared its trim with the F-150 Platinum. To differentiate it from the Navigator, the Mark LT was given a split grille in the style of the MKS and MKT.

The Mark LT was built in two versions along with the F-150: the short-bed Dearborn and the long bed Cuautitlán.

With the introduction of the 2015 F-Series, no Lincoln Mark LT was created, making the 2014 model year the last for the Mark LT.

Quality
J.D. Power Quality listed the Mark LT as overall dependability for all 3 years it was manufactured as "among the best" (with a minimum 4 stars for the 2006 variant in initial quality).

Sales

References

External links

Lincoln Mark LT official homepage (Spanish)

Mark LT
Pickup trucks
Rear-wheel-drive vehicles
All-wheel-drive vehicles
2010s cars
Cars introduced in 2005